Dschinghis Khan (released internationally as Genghis Khan) is the debut album by German disco group Dschinghis Khan. The album includes the band's breakthrough single, also called "Dschinghis Khan", with which they represented Germany at the Eurovision Song Contest 1979, finishing in 4th position. Included is also the follow-up "Moskau", a tribute to the Russian capital Moscow. Both singles were also released in English-language versions in certain markets, entitled "Genghis Khan" and "Moscow" respectively.

Track listing
Original release

Australian release

Charts

Weekly charts

Year-end charts

References

External links
 
 

1979 debut albums
Dschinghis Khan albums
German-language albums